Ennio Vanotti (born 13 September 1955) is an Italian former racing cyclist. He rode in seventeen Grand Tours between 1978 and 1990.

References

External links
 

1955 births
Living people
Italian male cyclists
Cyclists from the Province of Brescia
Tour de Suisse stage winners